A pad site or outparcel is a freestanding parcel of commercial real estate located in the front of a larger shopping center or strip mall. Desirable because of their visibility to consumers, accessibility, and the ease of facilitating drive-thru service, pad sites are typically sought after by banks, casual dining, and fast food restaurants. Pad sites usually range between 2,000 and 75,000 square feet. They can be ground leased by developers or purchased outright. The former offers a lower up-front cost, but the user is unable to use the land as collateral to finance building expenses because pad sites do not have their own legal address. The latter requires a larger capital investment, but provides the user an appreciable asset in real estate.

References 

Commercial real estate